Arthur Paul Harper  (27 June 1865 – 30 May 1955) was a New Zealand lawyer, mountaineer, explorer, businessman and  conservationist. He was simply known as AP or APH. He was born at his parents' house in Armagh Street, Christchurch, New Zealand, in 1865.

He was the son of the MP and lawyer Leonard Harper; Bishop Henry Harper was his grandfather. He matriculated at Christ Church, Oxford in 1884. He was the inaugural secretary and treasurer of the New Zealand Alpine Club, which was founded in July 1891 in Christchurch.

In 1935, Harper was awarded the King George V Silver Jubilee Medal. In 1950 he was awarded the Loder Cup. In the 1952 New Year Honours he was appointed a Commander of the Order of the British Empire for services to the community. He died in Wellington in 1955.

Selected publications

References

1865 births
1955 deaths
New Zealand businesspeople
19th-century New Zealand lawyers
New Zealand conservationists
New Zealand mountain climbers
New Zealand explorers
People from Christchurch
New Zealand Commanders of the Order of the British Empire
Arthur Paul